Greasy Creek is a stream in Wayne County in the U.S. state of Missouri. It is a tributary of McKenzie Creek.

The stream mouth is about two miles north of Piedmont. An area in the upper reaches of the stream is impounded as Dover Lake.

Greasy Creek most likely was so named on account of the often muddy character of its water.

See also
List of rivers of Missouri

References

Rivers of Wayne County, Missouri
Rivers of Missouri